Dihydrogen phosphate is an inorganic ion with the formula [H2PO4]−. Phosphates occur widely in natural systems.

These sodium phosphates are artificially used in food processing and packaging as emulsifying agents, neutralizing agents, surface-activating agents, and leavening agents providing humans with benefits. Emulsifying agents prevent separation of two ingredients in processed foods that would separate under natural conditions while neutralizing agents make processed foods taste fresher longer and lead to an increased shelf-life of these foods. Surface-activating agents prevent surface-tension formation on liquid-containing processed foods and finally, leavening agents are used in processed foods to aid in the expansion of yeast in baked goods.

Dihydrogen phosphate is employed in the production of pharmaceuticals furthering their importance to medical practitioners of gastroenterology and humans in general. In this medical discipline, sodium phosphates are used as natural laxatives. Other medical applications include using sodium and potassium phosphates along with other medications to increase their therapeutic effects. Inflammation, certain cancers, and ulcers can benefit from the use of combination therapy with sodium and potassium phosphates.

Potassium dihydrogen phosphate, the potassium salt, is useful to human in the form of pesticides. Potassium dihydrogen phosphate is a fungicide that is used to prevent powdery mildew on many fruits. Fruits that can benefit from the addition of potassium dihydrogen phosphate includes common fruits, peppers, and roses.

Structure
The dihydrogen phosphate anion consists of a central phosphorus atom surrounded by 2 equivalent oxygen atoms and 2 hydroxy groups in a tetrahedral arrangement. Dihydrogen phosphate can be identified as an anion, an ion with an overall negative charge, with dihydrogen phosphates being a negative 1 charge. Dihydrogen phosphate contains 4 H bond acceptors and 2 H bond donors, and has 0 rotatable bonds.

Acid-base equilibria
Dihydrogen phosphate is an intermediate in the multi-step conversion of the polyprotic phosphoric acid to phosphate:

This multistep conversion exemplifies that the dihydrogen phosphate ion is the conjugate base to phosphoric acid, while also acting as the conjugate acid to the phosphate ion. This means that dihydrogen phosphate can be both a hydrogen donor and acceptor.

Examples
 Ammonium dihydrogen phosphate ((NH4)(H2PO4))
 Monocalcium phosphate (Ca(H2PO4)2)

Safety
Many foods including milk, eggs, poultry, and nuts contain these sodium phosphates.

Notes

References

Anions
Phosphates